Guaporé River is a river in western Brazil and northeastern Bolivia.

The Guaporé River is part of the Madeira River basin, which eventually empties into the Amazon River. The Guaporé River crosses the eastern part of the Beni savanna region.
It forms the border of the  Guaporé Biological Reserve, and is fed by rivers originating in the reserve, the São Miguel, Branco, São Simão, Massaco and Colorado.

About 260 fish species are known from the Guaporé River basin, and about 25 of these are endemic. While many fish species in the river essentially are Amazonian, the fauna in the Guaporé also has a connection with the Paraguay River (part of the Río de la Plata Basin). The Guaporé and the Paraguay, while flowing in different directions, both originate in the Parecis plateau of Brazil. Among the fish species shared between these rivers are the black phantom tetra (important in the aquarium industry) and golden dorado (important in fisheries).

See also
Mamoré–Guaporé linguistic area

References

Rivers of Mato Grosso
Rivers of Beni Department
Bolivia–Brazil border
International rivers of South America
Rivers of Santa Cruz Department (Bolivia)
Border rivers